Erzurum Technical University is a public university located in Erzurum, Turkey. It was founded in 2010 as one of the six technical universities in Turkey. The university consists of 6 faculties, 1 graduate school and 3 institutes. The undergraduate and graduate education have started in 2012, and the number of undergraduate and graduate students is over 1,000 in 2013.  Erzurum Technical University aims to become a research hub in the region.

Academic units

Faculties
Faculty of Economics and Business Administration
Faculty of Engineering and Architecture
Faculty of Health Sciences
Faculty of Letters
Faculty of Sciences
Faculty of Sports Sciences

Graduate School
School of Foreign Languages

Institutes
Institute of Health Sciences
Institute of Sciences
Institute of Social Sciences

References

Universities and colleges in Turkey
2010 establishments in Turkey
State universities and colleges in Turkey
Educational institutions established in 2010
Erzurum